The Albert Campbell House was a historic house at 434 Marshman Avenue in Highland Park, Illinois. The house's construction date and builder are unknown, though it was most likely built in the early twentieth century. The house has a bungalow-style design inspired by the American Craftsman movement. The house's design features a low profile and several stained glass and etched glass windows. A sizable addition was placed on the west side of the house in 1927, and a second addition was added in the 1930s.

The house was added to the National Register of Historic Places on September 29, 1982. It has since been demolished.

References

National Register of Historic Places in Lake County, Illinois
Houses on the National Register of Historic Places in Illinois
American Craftsman architecture in Illinois
Highland Park, Illinois